Dunstanoides is a genus of South Pacific intertidal spiders first described by Norman I. Platnick in 1989.

Species
 it contains nine species, all found in New Zealand:
Dunstanoides angustiae (Marples, 1959) – New Zealand
Dunstanoides hesperis (Forster & Wilton, 1973) – New Zealand
Dunstanoides hinawa (Forster & Wilton, 1973) – New Zealand
Dunstanoides hova (Forster & Wilton, 1973) – New Zealand
Dunstanoides kochi (Forster & Wilton, 1973) – New Zealand
Dunstanoides mira (Forster & Wilton, 1973) – New Zealand
Dunstanoides montana (Forster & Wilton, 1973) – New Zealand
Dunstanoides nuntia (Marples, 1959) – New Zealand
Dunstanoides salmoni (Forster & Wilton, 1973) – New Zealand

References

Araneomorphae genera
Desidae
Spiders of New Zealand